Lusitanops expansus is a species of sea snail, a marine gastropod mollusk in the family Raphitomidae.

Description
The length of the shell attains .

Distribution
This species occurs off Arctic Norway in the North Atlantic Ocean.

References

 Gofas, S.; Le Renard, J.; Bouchet, P. (2001). Mollusca, in: Costello, M.J. et al. (Ed.) (2001). European register of marine species: a check-list of the marine species in Europe and a bibliography of guides to their identification. Collection Patrimoines Naturels, 50: pp. 180–213

External links
 Sars, G.O. (1878). Bidrag til Kundskaben om Norges arktiske Fauna. I. Mollusca Regionis Arcticae Norvegiae. Oversigt over de i Norges arktiske Region Forekommende Bløddyr. Brøgger, Christiania. xiii + 466 pp., pls 1-34 & I-XVIII
 

expansus
Gastropods described in 1878